Henryk Michał Kamieński (1813–1865) was a Polish philosopher.

References 
 Discourses of Collective Identity in Central and Southeast Europe (1770–1945), vol. 2: National Romanticism - The Formation of National Movements, ed. B. Trencsényi, M. Kopeček, Central European University Press, Budapest 2007, s. 221-227.

1813 births
1865 deaths
19th-century Polish philosophers